Kletting Peak is a mountain in Summit County, Utah, named in 1964 for Utah architect Richard K.A. Kletting (1858-1943). It is in the High Uintas Wilderness and the Uinta-Wasatch-Cache National Forest.

It ranks 101st on a list of Utah mountains having more than 200 feet of prominence.

References

External links
 
 
 

Mountains of Utah
Mountains of Summit County, Utah